Shayna Jack (born 6 November 1998) is an Australian swimmer. She competed at the 2017 World Aquatics Championships, where she won two silver and two bronze medals in the relay events.

From 2019 to 2021, Jack served a 24 month suspension upheld by the Court of Arbitration for Sport for an anti-doping rule violation on 26 June 2019.

2014: Double Junior Pan Pacific champion at 15 years of age
At the 2014 Junior Pan Pacific Swimming Championships, held in August in Kihei, United States, 15-year-old Jack won a gold medal in the 4×100 meter freestyle relay with a Championships record time of 3:39.73, the gold medal in the 100 meter freestyle with a 54.82, the silver medal in the 200 meter freestyle with a 1:59.48, a silver medal in the 4×200 meter freestyle relay, and placed fifth in the 50 meter freestyle.

2019–2021: Positive doping test, Suspension
Jack pulled out of the 2019 World Aquatics Championships days before it started, citing "personal reasons". It was later revealed that Jack had tested positive for the anabolic agent Ligandrol, which is popular with bodybuilders, during an out-of-competition test held by the Australian Sports Anti-Doping Authority (ASADA); a follow-up sample further confirmed the banned substance in her system, and she was subsequently suspended by Swimming Australia and investigated by ASADA. She posted on Instagram saying that she "would never intentionally take a banned substance that would disrespect my sport and jeopardise my career". The investigation by ASADA was ongoing as of 29 July 2019.

The result of the investigation was unintentional ingestion of ligandrol by Jack and a 24 month suspension by the Court of Arbitration for Sport running from 12 July 2019 through 11 July 2021 for the anti-doping rule violation. In September 2021, after Jack served the entirety of the imposed suspension, the Court of Arbitration for Sport upheld the suspension as served in full when challenged by Sport Integrity Australia and that Jack could return to competition.

2022: Return to competition

2022 Australian Swimming Championships
In May, at the 2022 Australian Swimming Championships, held in Adelaide, Jack achieved 2022 World Aquatics Championships and 2022 Commonwealth Games qualifying times in two individual events, winning the 50 metre freestyle with a time of 24.14 seconds, and placing second in the 100 metre freestyle behind Mollie O'Callaghan with a time of 52.60 seconds.

2022 World Aquatics Championships
At the 2022 World Aquatics Championships, with swimming competition contested at Danube Arena in Budapest, Hungary in June, Jack won her first medal of the championships in the 4×100 metre freestyle relay, splitting a 52.65 for the fourth leg of the relay to help win the gold medal in a final time of 3:30.95. She won her second and final medal three days later in the 4×100 metre mixed medley relay, swimming the freestyle portion of the finals relay in 52.92 seconds to contribute to the silver medal-winning time of 3:41.34 along with finals relay teammates Kaylee McKeown (backstroke), Zac Stubblety-Cook (breaststroke), and Matthew Temple (butterfly).

2022 Commonwealth Games
In the 4×100 metre freestyle relay at the 2022 Commonwealth Games, held in Birmingham, England, Jack helped win the gold medal in a time of 3:30.64 by splitting a 52.72 for the second leg of the relay in the final. For the 50 metre freestyle, she swam a time of 24.36 seconds in the final to win the bronze medal, securing the final podium spot by finishing 0.42 seconds ahead of fourth-place finisher Emma Chelius of South Africa. In the 100 metre freestyle, she finished 0.25 seconds behind gold medalist Mollie O'Callaghan with a time of 52.88 seconds to win the silver medal. On 10 August, following her medal-winning performances at the 2022 Commonwealth Games, Jack was named to the 2022 Duel in the Pool roster for Team Australia.

Television
In 2020, it was announced Jack would be participating the Seven Network's reality program SAS Australia.

World records

Long course metres

 split 54.03 (1st leg); with Bronte Campbell (2nd leg), Emma McKeon (3rd leg), Cate Campbell (4th leg)

References

External links
 

1998 births
Living people
Place of birth missing (living people)
Swimmers at the 2018 Commonwealth Games
Swimmers at the 2022 Commonwealth Games
Commonwealth Games medallists in swimming
Commonwealth Games gold medallists for Australia
Commonwealth Games silver medallists for Australia
Commonwealth Games bronze medallists for Australia
World Aquatics Championships medalists in swimming
Australian female freestyle swimmers
World record setters in swimming
Doping cases in Australian swimming
20th-century Australian women
21st-century Australian women
Medallists at the 2018 Commonwealth Games
Medallists at the 2022 Commonwealth Games